Darryl Brown (born 18 December 1973, McBean, Trinidad) is a former West Indian cricketer who played three ODIs in 2001–02.

References

1973 births
Living people
West Indies One Day International cricketers
Trinidad and Tobago cricketers